The Oratory Church of Saint Wilfrid, York (or York Oratory for short) is a Catholic church in York, England. 

A church dedicated to Saint Wilfrid has stood in York since medieval times. The church is known as the "Mother Church of the city of York". It is in Gothic Revival style. The arch over the main door has the most detailed Victorian carving in the city. The present church was completed in 1864 and is considered to be one of the most perfectly finished Catholic churches in England, rich in sculptures, paintings and stained glass. In 2013, the church was entrusted to the Oratorian Fathers.

It is within the Diocese of Middlesbrough and was the second pro-Cathedral of the Diocese of Beverley until its dissolution in 1878.

History
In the early 1500s, Saint Wilfrid's was an advowson of the Benedictine Saint Mary's Abbey, York.
In 1585, the parish could not support itself; the church became redundant, had fallen into disuse, and was demolished. It was eventually built over and the parish united with Saint Michael le Belfry. Saint Wilfrid's parish was revived by York Catholics in 1742 when they established their Mission in Little Blake Street. The Mission was founded by the Vicar Apostolic of the Northern District of England, Edward Dicconson.

A Catholic priest's house was established at number 7 Little Blake Street (now Duncombe Place), known as Chapel House. In 1760, the first public place of worship for Catholics opened in York. The chapel continued until 1802 when another chapel was built on the opposite side of the street (on the present site). At this time there were still strong anti-Catholic feelings, so the chapel was hidden from the street by its presbytery. The chapel could hold 700 people and the Catholic population continued to increase in York.

Present church
A church dedicated to Saint Wilfrid has stood in York since medieval times. The original site of the church was on land now occupied by the Judges Lodgings in Lendal and part of the Assembly Rooms behind in Blake Street. In 1848, plans were drawn up to build a new church. The funds, however, were diverted to build a much needed church in the Walmgate area for the large number of Irish Catholics who settled there during the Great Famine. Saint George's Church was built and it became the Pro-Cathedral of the Catholic diocese of Beverley.

In 1859, York Corporation were planning a new approach road to Lendal Bridge. This prompted Dean Duncombe to apply to the corporation to continue the route by the chapel and towards the Minster. The old narrow lane (Lop Lane or Little Blake Street) was replaced with a wide thoroughfare. The houses on the opposite side to the chapel were demolished and the road widened to create Duncombe Place, named after the Dean.

Saint Wilfrid's became the Pro-Cathedral Church of the Beverley Diocese. This was short lived as Beverley diocese was split to make the Dioceses of Leeds (south of the River Ouse) and of Middlesbrough (north of the river). The Church of St Wilfrid is often known by Catholics as the “Mother Church of the City of York”, since its history connects it to the first, hidden revival of the Catholic faith in this city.

Architecture
The Oratory Church, as it stands today, was to be built on the site of the old chapel. The architect of the building was George Goldie, son of a prominent parishioner Dr. George Goldie, and was baptised in Saint Wilfrid's chapel. He later designed Saint Wilfrid's Primary School nearby, but died in 1887 before the school was built. The church was designed as Gothic Revival, a copy of 13th–14th century style. The arch over the main door has the most detailed Victorian carving in the city.

The foundation stone was laid in April 1862 by Bishop Cornthwaite. The present church was completed in 1864 for the sum of £10,000. It was opened by Cardinal Wiseman in June 1864. It was considered to be "one of the most perfectly finished Catholic Churches in England, rich in sculpture, stained glass and fittings". Part of the porch way, believed to belong to the original Saint Wilfrid's Church, was found under the floor of the Assembly Rooms during the 19th century renovations.

The church became a grade II listed building in 1968.

Tower 
The tower is some 147 ft high and is visible around much of York. The design of the tower makes it appear as though the Oratory is taller than the Minster in the background; it is only when a person has passed the Oratory Church that they can see the Minster is taller. 

The tower holds a fine peal of ten bells, in addition to an Angelus bell (added in 2019 and named “John Henry”) with the heaviest eight bells dating from 1938. The chime was cast at the foundry of Gillett & Johnston in Croydon, and installed at Saint John's Church in Thornham. The bells became available in 1993, and relocated to Saint Wilfrid's. Two lighter bells were added in 1995 to create a peal of ten. They were cast by John Taylor & Co of Loughborough. One is inscribed "Saint Wilfrid"; the other bears the inscription "Ringers ring with one accord. Make beautiful music to praise the Lord".

Furnishings 

They were made in 1948 by Wilfrid Dowson, from Kirkbymoorside, who was responsible for some work at York Minster, as well as the Queen's Gates at Saint George's Chapel in Windsor Castle. The rails were altered and temporarily removed in February 2007. The organ is an 1867 Forster and Andrews, restored in 1998 by Harrison & Harrison.

Parish
The church has daily Mass. The Traditional Latin Mass is celebrated at 8:15am from Monday till Friday, 9:15am on Saturday (Low Mass) and on Sunday at 12:00pm (Sung Mass). The Novus Ordo Mass is celebrated in English at 12:10pm daily, 5:00pm on Saturday (Vigil Mass) and on Sunday at 8:30am (Low) and 10:30am (Sung).

The church has sung Vespers at 4:00pm and (immediately following) Benediction at 4:30pm every Sunday.

The Oratory offers four choral scholarships through the University of York to both undergraduate and postgraduate female and male students: sopranos, altos, tenors and basses to form a quartet.

The church's rectory is in Petergate House.  In 1945, Middlesbrough Diocese bought a 16th-century house in the Shambles. Number 35 is now the shrine of Saint Margaret Clitherow, who was martyred in York. It is a pilgrimage site for Catholics from all over the world.

See also
 Petergate House
 More House

References

External links

Official website - York Oratory
St Wilfrid's RC School, York
Oratory of Saint Philip Neri - Procurator General (Rome)

 St. Wilfrid's, BBC Radio 4 "Bells on Sunday", September 2019

Grade II listed churches in York
George Goldie church buildings
Oratorian communities in the United Kingdom
Roman Catholic churches in York
History of York
History of Catholicism in England
Oratorian communities
Duncombe Place